East Marshall Community School District is a rural public school district headquartered in Gilman, Iowa. It operates an elementary school in Laurel, a middle school in Gilman, and a high school in Le Grand.

The district is mostly in Marshall County with portions in Tama, Jasper, and Poweshiek counties. The district includes 
Gilman, Laurel, Le Grand, Ferguson and a small portion of Marshalltown.

The district was established on July 1, 1992, by the merger of the LDF and SEMCO school districts.

The school's mascot is the Mustang. Their colors are purple and gold.

Schools
East Marshall Elementary School
East Marshall Middle School
East Marshall Senior High School

East Marshall Senior High School

Athletics
The Mustangs compete in the North Iowa Cedar League Conference in the following sports:

Cross Country 
 Boys' 2014 Class 2A State Champions
Volleyball 
Football 
Basketball 
Wrestling 
Track and Field 
Golf 
Baseball
Softball
Soccer

See also
List of school districts in Iowa
List of high schools in Iowa

References

External links
 East Marshall Community School District (emmustangs.org)
 East Marshall Community School District (e-marshall.k12.ia.us)

School districts in Iowa
1992 establishments in Iowa
School districts established in 1992